Jake Smith was an American Negro league third baseman in the 1920s.

Smith played for the Harrisburg Giants in 1924. In eight recorded games, he posted nine hits in 39 plate appearances.

References

External links
 and Baseball-Reference Black Baseball Stats and Seamheads

Year of birth missing
Year of death missing
Place of birth missing
Place of death missing
Harrisburg Giants players
Baseball third basemen